Michael Fitzgerald (born 10 May 1970) is a retired Irish National Hunt jockey and current television racing pundit. Fitzgerald rode for the majority of his career in Great Britain and less often Ireland.

Career as a Jockey

Mick Fitzgerald's career lasted for over 15 years. After experience on the Pony racing circuit in Ireland he began riding out for Richard Lister, a local flat trainer in County Wexford, at the age of 16. This was followed by a move to the Curragh to ride out for John Hayden. Once he had left school at 18, a growth spurt led to an increase in weight forcing a switch to National Hunt racing. Fitzgerald's first National Hunt yards were in South West England with John Jenkins and Richard Tucker. His first two winners came during this association at the end of 1988, the first being a horse called Lover's Secret at Ludlow on 11 December. However it took until 1991/2 National Hunt season for Fitzgerald to obtain regular rides and winners. This was with Jackie Retter before he struck up a partnership with Ray Callow's Duncan Idaho allowing him to showcase his skills. Looking back on the years between 1988 and 1991 he has confessed to almost giving up and moving to Australia.

After proving himself with regular rides he was given a retainer to Lambourn trainer Nicky Henderson. This was to become long standing job as the main stable jockey lasting until the end of his career. Fitzgerald's big winners included the Grand National, on Rough Quest in 1996, and the Cheltenham Gold Cup on See More Business in 1999. He was leading jockey at the Cheltenham Festival in 1999 and 2000. This reflected a relationship with Paul Nicholls alongside his retainer who at the time was an up-and-coming trainer. Later in his career, Fitzgerald came back from injury to win the 2005 Hennessy Gold Cup on Trabolgan at Newbury for Nicky Henderson. The winner was special for all as Fitzgerald had returned from injury inspired by the horse, and as the Newbury racecourse is close to Lambourn the race is extra-special for the Lambourn racing community.

During 2008 Grand National in which he was riding L'Ami he fell at the second fence sustaining spinal injuries. This was the second injury of this type he sustained in the latter part of his career. On 7 August 2008 due to his injury, aged 38, Fitgerald was forced into retirement as any return came with the threat of paralysis. Fitzgerald had initially planned to retire in Spring 2007 on the offer of a sporting hospitality job, but Nicky Henderson had such a successful season that Fitzgerald found it impossible to hang up his boots. Although his career was cut short he is still one of the most successful jump jockeys of all time riding over 1300 winners.

Career post retirement

Mick Fitzgerald is now a popular face presenting and analysing both flat and National hunt races. Initially working for At The Races, in 2013 he joined the Channel 4 Racing team to give an insight into the racecraft and training of jockeys. Fitzgerald transferred to ITV Racing in 2017. Despite being unable to ride since his injury, he is still closely involved in racing. When not on TV, he spends time at Nicky Henderson's yard helping to advise about race tactics. Fitzgerald is also involved in the British Racing School, coaching young and aspiring jockeys on their technique as well as attitude.

Personal life

Mick Fitzgerald lives in the Lambourn area of Berkshire. He has three children and lives with his wife. Fitgerald had an earlier marriage, and was at one time brother-in-law to Paul Nicholls by marriage. Fitzgerald is a well known character on the Lambourn racing scene, and is a close friend of Champion Jockey AP McCoy, with the pair playing golf together often. Fitzgerald has become a patron to Alder Hey Charity.

Fitzgerald wrote an autobiography when he finished riding, called "Better Than Sex: my autobiography". The title comes from his famous quote to Des Lynam live on the BBC after winning the 1996 National – "After that, Des, even sex is an anticlimax!".

Cheltenham Festival wins (14)

 Cheltenham Gold Cup - (1) See More Business (1999)
 Queen Mother Champion Chase - (1) Call Equiname (1999)
 Stayers' Hurdle - (1) Bacchanal (2000)
 Arkle Challenge Trophy - (1) Tiutchev (2000)
 RSA Insurance Novices' Chase - (1) Trabolgan (2005)
 Ryanair Chase - (1) Fondmort (2006)
 Triumph Hurdle - (1) Katarino (1999)
 Festival Trophy Handicap Chase - (2) Rough Quest (1995), Marlborough (2000)
 Coral Cup - (1) Xenophon (2003)
 Brown Advisory & Merriebelle Stable Plate Handicap Chase - (1) Non So (2006)
Cathcart chase 1994 Ramylette 
Cathcart chase Stormy Fairweather 1999 & 2000
Ritz club chase 1995 Rough Quest

Other major wins

 Great Britain

 Grand National - (1) Rough Quest (1996)
 King George VI Chase - (1) See More Business (1999)
 Tingle Creek Chase - (1) Kauto Star (2005)
 Christmas Hurdle - (2) Geos (2000), Landing Light (2001)
 Henry VIII Novices' Chase - (1) Fondmort (2001)
 Kauto Star Novices' Chase - (3) Fiddling the Facts (1997), Bacchanal (2000), Ungaro (2006)
 Finale Juvenile Hurdle - (3) 	Mister Banjo (1999), Blue Shark (2005),	Good Bye Simon (2006)
 Ascot Chase - (1) Tiutchev (2001)
 Betway Bowl - (1) See More Business (2000)
 Aintree Hurdle -(1) Bimsey (1997)
 Mildmay Novices' Chase - (1) Irish Hussar (2003)
 Sefton Novices' Hurdle - (1) Chief Dan George (2007)
 

 Ireland

 Punchestown Champion Chase - (2) Big Matt (1998), Get Real (2000)
 Ryanair Novice Chase - (1) Tiutchev (2000)
 Champion Four Year Old Hurdle - (3) Katarino (1999), Quatre Heures (2006), Punjabi (2007)
 Chanelle Pharma Novice Hurdle - (1) Royal Paradise (2005)

References

 BBC website profile
 

1970 births
Irish jockeys
Lester Award winners
Living people
Sportspeople from County Cork